Government Teachers' Training College, Comilla is a government college for training teachers in Kotbari, Comilla, Bangladesh.

History 
Government Teachers' Training College was established in 1962.  Degrees offered include B.Ed. and M.Ed.

See also
 Education in Bangladesh
 List of Educational Institutions in Comilla
 List of Teachers Training Colleges in Bangladesh

References

Teacher training colleges in Bangladesh
Colleges in Comilla District